The 125th New York Infantry Regiment was a volunteer regiment from Rensselaer County, New York, during the American Civil War. Formed during the summer of 1862, the unit was officially mustered into United States Service on 27–29 August 1862, by Col. George L. Willard. He had seen previous service in the War of the Rebellion and in the Mexican War as well. Levin Crandall was commissioned lieutenant colonel, and James C. Bush major.  The unit was mustered out on 5 June 1865.

Regimental history

Colonel John A. Griswold was authorized, 28 July 1862, to raise this regiment in Rensselaer county; on his resignation, Col. George L. Willard succeeded him 15 August 1862; the regiment was organized at Troy and there mustered in the service of the United States for three years 27–29 August 1862. The men not entitled to be mustered out with the regiment were on 5 June 1865, transferred to the 4th Artillery.

The regiment left Troy, 30 August 1862, and proceeded by rail to Martinsburg, Virginia, and a few days later it marched to and was engaged in the Battle of Harpers Ferry. A few of its number were killed and wounded during this battle, and the regiment together with the rest of the garrison, totaling over 11,500 men, surrendered to the Confederates on 15 September 1862.

With the other captured troops, the men were sent under parole to Camp Douglas, Chicago, to remain there while awaiting exchange, which was effected 22 November. The regiment was then ordered back to Virginia, where it was attached to Maj. Gen. Silas Casey's Division, in the defenses of Washington at Maryland Heights, and encamped at Centreville until 24 June 1863, when it joined the Second Corps, Army of the Potomac, and marched away to Gettysburg. Gen. Alexander Hays, who commanded the brigade while at Centreville, was placed in command of the division, and Colonel George L. Willard took over command of the brigade, which was composed of four New York regiments — the 39th, 111th, 125th, and 126th.

Under command of Colonel Crandall, the 125th fought at Gettysburg where it lost 139 killed and wounded. Colonel Willard was killed while in command of the brigade, and Crandall was promoted colonel. Maj. A. B. Myer was made lieutenant colonel, and Capt. S. C. Armstrong, major.

The regiment was actively engaged at Auburn and Bristoe Station in October, losing 36 men in those battles. Capt. William H. Plumb was mortally wounded at Bristoe Station.

Colonel Crandall was temporarily absent on recruiting service, and Lieut. Col. Aaron B. Myer was in command at the battle of the Wilderness. He was mortally wounded in this engagement, and the command devolved on Capt. George E. Lemon. Color Sergt. Harrison Clark carried his flag within ten feet of the enemy's line, where he fell with his leg shattered by a rifle ball. Colonel Myer, who at that time had not yet fallen, assisted in binding Clark's wound and promoted him to a lieutenancy on the field. As Clark fell the flag was seized by Philip Brady, of Company I, but he was soon killed while waving the colors in advance of the men.

A few days later, at Spotsylvania, the regiment was in the thick of the fight, forming part of a storming column that moved against the enemy's works at daybreak on 12 May 1864. Capt. E. P. Jones, commanding the regiment, was killed in this assault, and Lieutenants Clapp and Cleminshaw were mortally wounded. Michael Burke of Company D captured an enemy's battle flag, but was shot down in the act, falling with a bullet through his breast. In the two battles of the Wilderness and Spotsylvania, the 125th lost 118 in killed and wounded.

On 26 May, Colonel Crandall returned from recruiting service and resumed command. The regiment was engaged at the Battle of North Anna, Battle of Totopotomoy Creek, and the Battle of Cold Harbor, with further losses in officers and men. Lieutenant Green was mortally wounded in the fight of 30 May at Totopotomoy.

In the Battle of Petersburg on 16 June, the decimated ranks were thinned again. Forty-four men were casualties, one-third of whom were killed in action. Another color sergeant, A. B. Green, was killed during the battle. Colonel Crandall was wounded by a piece of shell that struck him in the face. Lieutenants Bryan and Coleman were fatally wounded.

In the battle at the Weldon Railroad on 22 June, the regiment lost several men who were captured by the enemy, while three more officers—Adjutant Miller, and Lieutenants Hull and Barnes—died during a disastrous and badly led battle.

In addition to the minor battles of Reams' Station, Battle of Deep Bottom, Strawberry Plains, and Hatcher's Run, the regiment was daily engaged during the siege of Petersburg—from 16 July 1864, to 1 April 1865—on the picket line and in the trenches with frequent and continuous losses of men from wounds or by sickness caused by constant exposure. After the battle at Reams' Station, Capt. Nelson Penfield was placed in command, the colonel having been placed previously in charge of the brigade.

Colonel Crandall resigned 14 December 1864, after a distinguished and honorable term of service. He was succeeded by Lieut. Col. Joseph Hyde, who had entered the regiment originally as a lieutenant in Company H.

On 29 March 1865, the men broke camp and, crossing Hatcher's Run, entered on their last campaign. The regiment was still in the Third Brigade (Henry J. Madill 's), First Division (Miles's), Second Corps (Humphreys'). On April 2d, the regiment took part in the charge of Miles's Division on the Confederate works at Sutherland's Station, a bloody affair in which Capt. John Quay was killed. The brigade suffered severely in this attack, Colonel Madill being badly wounded. In the subsequent battles of the Second Corps prior to Lee's surrender at Appomattox, the regiment was present but suffered only a slight loss.

After marching in the Grand Review at Washington it proceeded to Troy, N. Y., where the men received their final payment and were mustered out on 15 June 1865.

Organization
Volunteers were recruited by town and the 11 companies of the regiment were organized by region:
A Company: Hoosick Falls
B Company: Troy
C Company: Lansingburg, Troy, Sand Lake, Pittstown and Schaghticoke
D Company: Troy
E Company: Sand Lake, Stephentown, Nassau, and Hoag's Corner
F Company: Troy and Poestenkill
G Company: Troy and New York City
H Company: Troy
I Company: Troy and New York City
K Company: Schaghticoke and Troy

Campaigns
During the term of the unit's service in the Civil War, the 125th New York Volunteers saw the following service:

Battle of Harper's Ferry, West Virginia, 12–15 September 1862
Maryland Heights 12–13 September.
Bolivar Heights 14–15 September.
Surrendered 15 September.
Paroled 16 September and sent to Annapolis, Md., thence to Camp Douglas, Chicago, Illinois, and duty there guarding prisoners until November, 1862.
Declared exchanged 22 November 1862.
Moved to Washington, D.C., 23–25 November.
Camp at Arlington Heights, Virginia, until 3 December, and at Centreville, Virginia, until June, 1863.
Ordered to join Army of the Potomac in the field and Joined 2nd Army Corps 25 June 1863.
Battle of Gettysburg, Pennsylvania, 2–4 July
Pursuit of Lee to Manassas Gap, Virginia, 5–24 July.
Duty on lines of the Rappahannock and Rapidan until October.
Advance from the Rappahannock to the Rapidan 13–17 September.
Battle of Bristoe Station, 9–22 October
Auburn and Bristoe 14 October.
Advance to line of the Rappahannock 7–8 November.
Mine Run Campaign 26 November-2 December.
Duty near Brandy Station until May, 1864.
Demonstration on the Rapidan 6–7 February.
Campaign from the Rapidan to the James 3 May-15 June.
Battle of Wilderness, 5–7 May
Spottsylvania 8–12 May
Po River 10 May
Battle of Spotsylvania Court House, 12–21 May
 Assault on the Salient "Bloody Angle" 12 May.
Battle of North Anna
Battle of Totopotomoy Creek
Battle of Cold Harbor
 Jerusalem Road
Battle of Petersburg
Battle of Weldon Railroad
Second Battle of Ream's Station
Battle of Deep Bottom
 Strawberry Plains
Battle of Hatcher's Run
Battle of Petersburg
 White Oak Road
Battle of Sutherland's Station
 Fall of Petersburg
 Sailor's Creek
 Farmville
Appomattox Campaign

Casualties

During its various campaigns and battles the 125th New York sustained a loss of 15 officers and 112 enlisted men, killed or mortally wounded; 1 officer and 112 enlisted men who died of disease, accidents, or in Confederate prisons; total deaths, 240, out of a total enrollment of 1,248. Of the 113 who died of disease, 58 died in the hands of the enemy. The total of killed and wounded in all its battles amounted to 464.

During its service the regiment lost by death, killed in action, 7 officers, 70 enlisted men; of wounds received in action, 8 officers, 42 enlisted men; of disease and other causes, 1 officer, 115 enlisted men; total, 16 officers, 227 enlisted men; aggregate, 243; of whom 3 officers, 61 enlisted men died in the hands of the enemy.

Medal of Honor recipients

Michael Burke 

Burke was born in Ireland and like many immigrants joined the army. He enlisted at Troy, Rensselaer County, NY. A Private in Company D, 125th New York Infantry, at Battle of Spotsylvania Court House on 12 May 1864, he captured the enemy's flag while advancing over the enemy's works at Spotsylvania, Virginia, and sustained a bullet wound to the chest. His Medal of Honor was issued on 1 December 1864.

Harrison Clark

Harrison Clark, born 10 April 1842 at Chatham, New York, entered Federal service in the US Army at Chatham. He earned The Medal of Honor during the Civil War for heroism on 2 July 1863 at Gettysburg, Pennsylvania.

"At the battle of the Wilderness, Color-Sergeant Clark displayed rare bravery and continued fighting, though shot in the leg. He was promoted lieutenant on the battlefield."

He died 18 April 1913 at the age of 71.

See also
Historical reenactment
List of New York Civil War regiments

References

Further reading
Churchhill, Lee. "Extracts from the diary of Captain...One hundred and twenty-fifth regiment, New York volunteers." Fifth annual report of the New York state Bureau of military statistics, 1868.
Jackson, Edward C. "The bloody angle." MOLLUS-Neb. I 258-62.
Lord, George A. A short narrative and military experience of Corp. G.A. Lord. Contains some very interesting incidents of his military career during the rebellion. Also the Declaration of rights, Articles of confederation, the Declaration of the United States and Washington's Farewell address. [Troy].
Lord, George A. A short narrative and military experience of Corp. G.A. Lord. Containing a four-year's history of the war, the Constitution of the United States in full, a correct list of stamp duties, and also patriotic songs of the latest selection. [Troy: 1864].
Simons, Ezra de Freest. 
Talbot, Edith (Armstrong). Samuel Chapman Armstrong, a biographical study. New York: Doubleday, Page & co., 1904.
Stickelmyer, Joseph  "Friend Jennie" civil war letters by Lt George Bryan 125th New York Volunteers Inf

External links
 History, photographs, table of battles and casualties, monument at Gettysburg, and battle flag for the 125th New York Infantry Regiment.
 
 * 
Private of 125th New York infantry

This article contains text from public domain sources.

Infantry 125
1862 establishments in New York (state)
Military units and formations established in 1862
Military units and formations disestablished in 1865